Jami Syekh Abdul Hamid Abulung Mosque, also known as Datu Abulung Mosque is an old mosque in South Kalimantan province, Indonesia, which is located in Sungai Batang village, West Martapura district, Martapura. The mosque was built by the king of Banjar, Sultan Tahmidullah II who ruled the area during 1761 to 1801, as a form of retribution for ordering the executions of Datu Abulung, a scholar who had been accused of heresy. The mosque is one of the cultural heritages in Martapura.

References 

Banjarese architecture
Buildings and structures in South Kalimantan
Mosques in Indonesia